Graeme Gilbert (born 15 April 1950) is an Australian radio presenter. He is the host of nightly radio program Talk Tonight with Graeme Gilbert on Sydney radio station 2SM and the Super Radio Network. He has hosted the show for over a decade and has interviewed notable people including John Howard, the former Prime Minister of Australia. Gilbert has received a B&T Award for Best News Presenter and a RAWARD for Best Current Affairs Commentator. Gilbert ran as a Liberal Party candidate for the division of Franklin, Tasmania in the 1993 Australian federal election. He lost with 9.86% swing against him.

On 15 May 2006 his program was barraged by calls from members of the public, incorrectly stating that the answer to his trivia question, "Who is the Premier of Tasmania?", was "India" (the correct answer being Paul Lennon). The joke persists to this day, with callers randomly saying "India" on air. The story was picked up by ABC Television's Media Watch program.

Gilbert's night time radio program recorded the lowest ever ratings for a commercial program in Sydney, attracting just 0.1% share of the available audience. Radio 2SM subsequently withdrew from the AC Nielsen Radio ratings.

References

External links 
Talk Tonight
India Prank

Australian radio presenters
Australian talk radio hosts
1950 births
Living people
Liberal Party of Australia politicians